The 1984–85 Louisiana Tech Bulldogs basketball team represented Louisiana Tech University in Ruston, Louisiana for the 1984–85 season. Although other players on the team as well as head coach Andy Russo were well in the spotlight, the real star of the show for the Bulldogs that season was Karl Malone. Malone would lead the Bulldogs to their best season to date in program history as well as earning himself All-American honors. Following the season, Malone would enter the NBA draft, being selected 13th overall by the Utah Jazz. Spending the majority of his career with Utah, Malone would be named an NBA All-Star fourteen times, NBA Most Valuable Player twice, and be inducted into the Basketball Hall of fame in 2010.

Roster

Source

Schedule and results

|-
!colspan=9 style=| Regular season

|-
!colspan=9 style=| Southland Conference tournament

|-
!colspan=9 style=| NCAA tournament

Rankings

Awards and honors
Karl Malone – All-American

NBA Draft

References

Louisiana Tech Bulldogs basketball seasons
Louisiana Tech
Louisiana Tech
1984 in sports in Louisiana
1985 in sports in Louisiana